Ruben Karapetyan (1963, Yerevan, Armenian SSR, USSR) is an Armenian diplomat, historian, author, Ambassador, Doctor of Historical Sciences, Professor.

Biography 
Ruben Karapetyan was born in 1963 in Yerevan. He graduated from the Faculty of Oriental Studies of Yerevan State University and was awarded a Master's degree in the field of Arabic Language and Literature in 1986. In 1993 he took part in the specially designed Intensive Political Science Course at Haigazian University in Beirut (Lebanon). In 1994, he received the Certificate for successfully completing the Diplomats Course at the Universities of Leeds, Edinburgh and Oxford (United Kingdom).

Ruben Karapetyan started his professional career at Yerevan State University, first as a Senior Inspector at the Foreign Relations Department and then as a Head of Section at the same Department (1986–1992).

He entered diplomatic service at the Ministry of Foreign Affairs of Armenia in 1994:

1994–1995 Attaché, 1st European Department, MFA of the RA.
1995–1996 Third Secretary, 2nd European Department, MFA of the RA.
1996 - Second Secretary, Embassy of the RA in Bulgaria.
1996–1997 Second Secretary, Consul, Embassy of the RA in Greece.
1997–1999 First Secretary, Deputy Head of Mission, Embassy of the RA in Greece.
1999–2000 Chief of Staff, MFA of the RA.
2000–2004 Director of the Asia-Pacific and Africa Department, MFA of the RA.
2004–2009 Ambassador Extraordinary and Plenipotentiary of the RA to the Arab Republic of Egypt.
2005–2009 Ambassador Extraordinary and Plenipotentiary of the RA to South Africa, Morocco, Libya, Sudan, Ethiopia (with residence in Cairo),

2008–2009 First Plenipotentiary Representative of the RA to the League of Arab States.
2008–2009 First Permanent Observer of the RA to the African Union.
2009–2013 Ambassador Extraordinary and Plenipotentiary of the RA to the Italian Republic.
2010–2013 Ambassador Extraordinary and Plenipotentiary of the RA to the Republics of Portugal, Slovenia, Croatia and Malta (with residence in Rome).
Since  February 2013 Founder & Chairman of the Board, “Dadivank” Armenian-Italian Foundation.
2016–2019 Leading Scientist, Institute of History, National Academy of Sciences․
2019–2020 Advisor to the Foreign Minister․ 
2020-2022 Diplomatic Advisor to the President.

Holds Diplomatic rank of Ambassador Extraordinary and Plenipotentiary.

He is fluent in Russian, English, Arabic and Italian.

Married, has a daughter and a grandson.

Teaching, scientific activities, memberships & affiliations 

In 1999 Ruben Karapetyan received a PhD in History from the Institute of Oriental Studies, Armenian National Academy of Sciences. Topic of dissertation was "US-Syrian relations (1967–1996)".
In 2008 he was awarded the highest scientific degree of Doctor of Historical Sciences by the Supreme Certifying Committee of Armenia for the thesis, "The Place and Role of Syria in the Arab-Israeli conflict (1946–2000)".
Since 2000 - Assistant Professor, Courses on “Arab Nationalism in the Twentieth Century”, “Problems of Religious and Ethnic Minorities in the Middle East”, Chair of Arabic Studies, Faculty of Oriental Studies, Yerevan State University.
Since 2015 - Professor, Courses on “Geopolitics of the South Caucasus” and “International Relations of the Middle East”, Chair of the World Politics and International Relations, Institute of Law and Politics, Russian-Armenian University.
2003–2004 Founding Head of South and South-East Asian Countries Division, Institute of Oriental Studies, National Academy of Sciences of Armenia.
1999–2004 Member of the Scientific Council of the Faculty of Oriental Studies, Yerevan State University.
2002–2004 Member of the Advisory Committee of Eurasia Foundation, Armenia.
Since 2014 - Member of the Scientific Council of the Institute of Law and Politics, Russian-Armenian University.
Since 2008 - Member of the Editorial Board of the “Journal of Arabic Studies" published by the Chair of Arab Studies, Faculty of Oriental Studies, Yerevan State University.
Since 2010 - Member of the Editorial Board of the “Bulletin of Social Sciences" journal published by National Academy of Sciences of Armenia.
Since 2012 - Member of the International Scientific Committee of the Institute of Geopolitical Studies and Auxiliary Sciences, (Istituto di Alti Studi in Geopolitica e Scienze Ausiliare, IsAG), (Rome, Italy).
Since 2016 - Member of the Editorial Board of the “Journal of Oriental Studies" (scholarly periodical journal) published by the Faculty of Oriental Studies, Yerevan State University.
2019 - Honorary Professor of Russian-Armenian University.
2019–2020 Member of the Board of Trustees of Yerevan State University.

Author of seven books and more than 30 articles on international relations and geopolitics of the Middle East and South Caucasus, as well as the textbook "New and Modern History of Arab Countries" for university students. (link to the book: "New and Modern History of Arab Countries" ( arm. "Արաբական երկրների նոր և նորագույն պատմություն" Yerevan, YSU Publishing House).

References 

1963 births
Living people
Diplomats from Yerevan
Yerevan State University alumni
Academic staff of Yerevan State University
20th-century Armenian historians
21st-century Armenian historians
21st-century Armenian male writers
Ambassadors of Armenia to Egypt
Ambassadors of Armenia to Morocco
Ambassadors of Armenia to Libya
Ambassadors of Armenia to Sudan
Ambassadors of Armenia to Ethiopia
Writers from Yerevan
Academic staff of Russian-Armenian University